Reeve Township may refer to the following places in the United States:
 Reeve Township, Daviess County, Indiana 
 Reeve Township, Franklin County, Iowa

Township name disambiguation pages